Dastjerd Rural District is a rural district (dehestan) in Alamut-e Gharbi District, Qazvin County, Qazvin Province, Iran. At the 2006 census, its population was 1,611, in 434 families.  The rural district has 18 villages.

References 

Rural Districts of Qazvin Province
Qazvin County